"Marathon" is the fourth track on Canadian rock band Rush's 1985 album Power Windows.

It is written by Rush guitarist Alex Lifeson and bassist/vocalist/keyboardist Geddy Lee, and its lyrics are written by drummer and lyricist Neil Peart. The lyrics depict how one would feel while running in an actual marathon, but the meaning of the song is meant to use a marathon (an extreme challenge) as a metaphor for life, and say that life is full of obstacles and is all about one taking small steps to achieve their personal goals.

In a 1986 interview, Peart said "(Marathon) is about the triumph of time and a kind of message to myself (because I think life is too short for all the things that I want to do), there's a self-admonition saying that life is long enough. You can do a lot -- just don't burn yourself out too fast trying to do everything at once. "Marathon" is a song about individual goals and trying to achieve them. And it's also about the old Chinese proverb: 'The journey of a thousand miles begins with one step."

The live version released on the "A Show of Hands" single reached number 6 on the US Mainstream Rock chart in 1989.

Composition 
During the mid-1980s, Rush's style was beginning to lean towards a more synthesizer based style of rock music, as opposed to their earlier, heavier guitar based hard rock and progressive rock. During the mid-1980s, Neil Peart was also beginning to experiment with an electronic drum kit. Power Windows is perhaps Rush's most heavily synthesizer influenced album. All of these elements are evident throughout the album, including on "Marathon". It contains different sections with both Geddy Lee's synthesizer as the lead instrument, as well as Alex Lifeson's guitar as the lead instrument. During the chorus, Lee's synthesizer is most prominent, while during the verses and solo passages there is a mix between synthesizer and guitar.

Live performances 
Marathon was first played on the 1985-1986 Power Windows Tour and was dropped after the 1990 Presto tour.

The song was brought back live into the set list of Rush's 2010-2011 Time Machine Tour. When the song was played on this tour, a pyrotechnic effect was used during the second verse after Lee sang the lyrics "more than just the bottom line or a lucky shot in the dark."

Performances of Marathon are included on the A Show of Hands concert film and A Show of Hands live album as well as the concert DVD, Blu-ray and double CD Time Machine 2011: Live in Cleveland.

See also
List of Rush songs

References

External links
http://www.songfacts.com/detail.php?id=3243 
https://web.archive.org/web/20110928082130/http://www.lyricsdomain.com/18/rush/marathon.html

1985 songs
1989 singles
Rush (band) songs
Songs written by Alex Lifeson
Songs written by Geddy Lee
Songs written by Neil Peart
Song recordings produced by Peter Collins (record producer)
Canadian new wave songs